Loud Records, LLC. is a record label founded by Steve Rifkind and Rich Isaacson in 1991.

Loud is a hip hop label that released material by acts such as Wu-Tang Clan, Big Pun, Mobb Deep, Krayzie Bone, The Beatnuts, M.O.P., Tha Alkaholiks, Pete Rock, Lil' Flip, Three 6 Mafia, Project Pat, Xzibit, Twista, Dead Prez, The Dwellas, and The X-Ecutioners. The label also released thrash metal band Megadeth's deluxe and remastered debut album Killing Is My Business... And Business Is Good! in 2002.

The label was originally distributed by Zoo. It was later distributed by RCA until 1999 when distribution moved over to Columbia.

In June 2007, Sony Music resurrected the label, after which Rifkind would buy it back, making it a subsidiary of SRC. His 1st act after re-gaining the label was, as he did 15 years earlier, signing the Wu-Tang Clan.

On July 29, 2012, Steve Rifkind announced that he was leaving Universal on September 1, 2012.

On October 6, 2017, after the 2017 BET Hip Hop Awards cipher with 6lack, Tee Grizzley, Little Simz, Mysonne and Axel Leon went live, Axel Leon said that he had made a deal with Rifkind via Instagram. Making Axel Leon the first person to be signed to Loud after Rifkind left Universal.

In 2020, Loud Records announced a re-launch of the label to be fully independent, giving clients the ability to own their masters. The re-launch included changing the name from Loud Records to Loud Music Group. The new label roster includes Rifkind's son, Ryrif.

Artists
The Alkaholiks
The Beatnuts
Big Pun (deceased)
Cella Dwellas
Davina
dead prez
Delinquent Habits
Adriana Evans
Funkmaster Flex
Gangsta Boo (deceased)
Havoc
Inspectah Deck
Killarmy
Krayzie Bone
L.V.
Lil' Flip
M.O.P.
Mad Kap
Yvette Michele
Mobb Deep
No Good
Prodigy (deceased)
Project Pat
Raekwon
Remy Ma
Pete Rock
Sadat X
Stereomud
Tash
Three 6 Mafia
Tung Twista
Wu-Tang Clan
The X-Ecutioners
Xzibit

See also 
List of record labels
Loud Records discography

References 

 
Defunct record labels of the United States
New York (state) record labels
Hardcore hip hop record labels
Hip hop record labels
Defunct companies based in New York City
Record labels established in 1992
Record labels disestablished in 2002
Record labels established in 2007
Record labels disestablished in 2012
Sony Music
SRC Records
Universal Records